NA-61 Jhelum-II is a constituency for the National Assembly of Pakistan.

Members of Parliament

1970–1977: NW-33 Jhelum-II

1970–1977: NW-34 Jhelum-III

1977–1988: NA-45 Jhelum-II

1977–1988: NA-46 Jhelum-III

1988–2002: NA-46 Jhelum-II

2002–2018: NA-63 Jhelum-II

2018-2023: NA-67 Jhelum-II

Election 2002 

General elections were held on 10 Oct 2002. Raja Muhammad Asad Khan of PML-N won by 46,722 votes.

Election 2008 

The result of general election 2008 in this constituency is given below.

Result 
Raja Muhammad Asad Khan succeeded in the election 2008 and became the member of National Assembly.

Election 2013 

General elections were held on 11 May 2013. Nawabzadah Raja Iqbal Mehdi Khan of PML-N won by 116,013 votes and became the  member of National Assembly.

By-election 2016 

By-election were held on 31 Aug 2016. Nawabzada Raja Matloob Mehdi of PML-N won by 81,612 votes and became the  member of National Assembly.

Election 2018 
General elections were held on 25 July 2018.

By-election 2023 
A by-election will be held on 16 March 2023 due to the resignation of Fawad Chaudhry, the previous MNA from this seat.

See also
NA-60 Jhelum-I
NA-62 Gujrat-I

References

External links 
Election result's official website
Delimitation 2018 official website Election Commission of Pakistan

67
67